Emiliano Daniel Armenteros (born 18 January 1986) is an Argentine professional footballer who plays for Spanish club CA Pinto as a left midfielder.

Club career

Argentina
Born in Monte Grande, Buenos Aires, Armenteros started playing professionally for Club Atlético Banfield, making his Primera División debut at only 17. In 2005, he was sold to Club Atlético Independiente for roughly US$1 million.

During his two-season spell with Los Diablos Rojos, Armenteros was an undisputed starter in spite of his young age.

Spain
In 2007, Armenteros joined Sevilla FC on loan, with the La Liga club having an option to buy for €2 million at the end of the season. He began his career at the Ramón Sánchez Pizjuán Stadium almost exclusively with the reserves, newly promoted to the Segunda División, only missing two league games in 42 in his first year and scoring seven goals as the team retained their divisional status.

Armenteros made his Spanish top flight debut on 19 October 2008, playing 15 minutes in a 1–0 away win against UD Almería. He collected a further three substitute appearances over the course of the campaign, netting in a 2–0 success at CD Numancia.

On 4 August 2009, Armenteros moved to neighbouring Xerez CD on loan. On 4 October, he scored the club's first-ever top division goal in a 1–1 home draw against Málaga CF, and welcomed his first child, Sofía, on the 27th; eventually, the team were relegated back.

On 15 July 2010, still on loan, Armenteros signed with second division club Rayo Vallecano. He netted a career-best 20 goals – including a hat-trick on 20 November 2010 in a 3–1 home win against SD Ponferradina– as the Madrid outskirts team returned to the top level after eight years.

On 6 July 2012, Armenteros joined CA Osasuna on a two-year contract. He scored three times in his first season, helping to a 16th-place finish in the top tier.

Later years
Starting in 2014–15, Armenteros spent three-and-a-half seasons in the Liga MX with Chiapas F.C. and Santos Laguna. In the last days of the 2018 January transfer window, the 32-year-old returned to Spain and Rayo in a five-month deal.

International career
Armenteros was part of the Argentina under-20 squad that won the 2005 FIFA World Youth Championship held in the Netherlands, appearing in five out of seven matches.

Honours
Rayo Vallecano
Segunda División: 2017–18

Argentina
FIFA U-20 World Cup: 2005

References

External links
 
 
 

1986 births
Living people
Sportspeople from Buenos Aires Province
Argentine footballers
Association football midfielders
Argentine Primera División players
Club Atlético Banfield footballers
Club Atlético Independiente footballers
La Liga players
Segunda División players
Segunda División B players
Tercera División players
Sevilla Atlético players
Sevilla FC players
Xerez CD footballers
Rayo Vallecano players
CA Osasuna players
UD Ibiza players
Liga MX players
Chiapas F.C. footballers
Santos Laguna footballers
Argentina under-20 international footballers
Argentine expatriate footballers
Expatriate footballers in Spain
Expatriate footballers in Mexico
Argentine expatriate sportspeople in Spain
Argentine expatriate sportspeople in Mexico